Al-Qarah FC  is a Saudi Arabian football (soccer) team in Al-Hasa City playing at the Saudi Fourth Division.

Stadium
Currently the team plays at the 20000 capacity Prince Abdullah bin Jalawi Stadium.

References

Qarah